librsvg is a free software SVG rendering library written as part of the GNOME project, intended to be lightweight and portable. The Linux command-line program rsvg-convert uses the library to turn SVG files into raster images.

Wikipedia and Wikimedia Commons use a version of librsvg 2.40 to render SVG as PNG.

Backends
librsvg uses two other libraries to perform tasks from reading the file to rendering to the screen:
 libxml is used to parse the XML representation of an SVG file into a form that can be accessed quickly by the library.
 cairo is used to render the information obtained by libxml to a block of memory.

Since v2.41.0 many parts have been rewritten in Rust.

Adoption
librsvg is developed for the GNOME desktop environment and as such is used by GNOME Files but is also intended to be used in other software applications. As a notable example, wikis hosted by Wikimedia use librsvg to render SVG images. It was once picked for these web applications because it was decidedly "fast but not very accurate", according to MediaWiki.

Upon switching to the cairo vector rendering engine in 2005, librsvg became more accurate and more visually pleasing. Since 2012 an independent developer published Win32 console ports ,  version 2.40.20. The  manual page is also available online.

Version history

Usage
On Linux with the librsvg2-bin package installed, an SVG file can be converted to PNG as follows:
$ rsvg-convert --format=png --output=diagram.png diagram.svg

Other supported output formats include PDF, XML, and valid SVG.

References

External links

 
 Download page
 Librsvg Reference Manual
 

C (programming language) libraries
Free software programmed in C
Free software programmed in Rust
GNOME libraries
Graphics libraries
Scalable Vector Graphics
Software that uses Cairo (graphics)